Varm korv boogie is a song written by Owe Thörnqvist. Describing a hot dog (varm korv in Swedish) salesman at Fyristorg in Uppsala, who turns to rock music after his business is closed down by the local health department, it is one of the earliest Swedish rock songs. Becoming one of his most famous songs, it has appeared in many songbooks at school in Sweden , and is common at sing-along events.

Owe Thörnqvist recorded the song on the 1959 single Svartbäckens ros., and an A-side single the same year, with Svartbäckens ros acting as B-side. In 1959 he also recorded it in Norwegian as Varm pølse boogie, with Gun fra Haugesund (Gun från Dragarbrunn) releasing it as a single the same year.

The song also appeared on the 1986 Owe Thörnqvist live album Owe Thörnqvist live.

Later recordings

References 

1959 singles
Thorleifs songs
Swedish rock songs
Family Four songs
Berth Idoffs songs
1959 songs
Songs written by Owe Thörnqvist